Paranthrene dollii, Doll's clearwing, cottonwood clearwing or poplar borer, is a moth of the family Sesiidae. It is found in North America.

The wingspan is about 37 mm. Adults are on wing from May to July.

The larvae feed on poplar and willow.

Sesiidae
Moths described in 1894